The Plasina Tunnel is located between Žuta Lokva and Ličko Lešće.  It is located between Otočac and Perušić interchanges of the Croatian A1 motorway.

The northern portal of the tunnel is located at 532 m.a.s.l., while the southern one is at 547 m.a.s.l. Excavation of the tunnel had been completed by January 2004. In 2006, the tunnel was declared to be among the top three safest tunnels in Europe by EuroTAP.

Traffic volume 

Traffic is regularly counted and reported by Hrvatske autoceste, operator of the motorway, and published by Hrvatske ceste. Substantial variations between annual (AADT) and summer (ASDT) traffic volumes are attributed to the fact that the motorway carries substantial tourist traffic to the Dalmatian Adriatic resorts. The traffic count is performed using analysis of toll ticket sales.

See also 
 A1 motorway
 Sveti Rok Tunnel
 Mala Kapela Tunnel
 Hrvatske autoceste

References 

Road tunnels in Croatia
Buildings and structures in Lika-Senj County
Tunnels completed in 2004